The Wild Flower Preservation Society of America is a defunct American non-profit organization dedicated to the conservation of native plants.

History 

The Wild Flower Preservation Society of America was organized in 1902, using funds from a gift of $3000 from Olivia Stokes and Caroline Phelps Stokes to the New York Botanical Garden.  The first meeting was held on April 23, 1902; Frederick Vernon Coville was elected president, Charles Louis Pollard was elected secretary, and Elizabeth Gertrude Britton was elected to the Board of Managers.  Other members of the board included Charles Edwin Bessey, Liberty Hyde Bailey, William Trelease, Charles Frederick Millspaugh, and Alice Eastwood.  The Society established numerous local chapters. It was incorporated in the state of New York in 1915.  

For a time, the Society published The Plant World, a journal that began publication in 1897.

By 1924, the scope of this formerly national organization was limited to New York.

References

Bibliography 
 
 

Flora of the United States
Native plant societies based in the United States